Alfred Edward Parker (1 May 1876 – 30 August 1958) was an Australian rules footballer who played for the St Kilda Football Club in the Victorian Football League (VFL).

References

External links 		
		

1876 births
1958 deaths
Australian rules footballers from Victoria (Australia)
St Kilda Football Club players